East Tallinn Central Hospital (Estonian: Ida-Tallinna Keskhaigla) is a hospital located in Tallinn, Estonia in the Veerenni subdistrict, on Ravi 18 street.

References

External links

Hospitals in Estonia
Buildings and structures in Tallinn